Emily Ruto (16 June 1989 – 24 October 2014) was a Kenyan cricketer and a former captain of the women's team. She died of leukemia aged 25.

References

1989 births
2014 deaths
Kenyan women cricketers
Cricketers from Nairobi
Deaths from cancer in Kenya
Deaths from leukemia